John Corigliano's Symphony No. 2 for Orchestra was commissioned by the Boston Symphony Orchestra to celebrate the 100th anniversary of Symphony Hall. The symphony’s first performance was by the Boston Symphony Orchestra conducted by Seiji Ozawa on November 30, 2000.

Instrumentation 

The symphony is scored for string orchestra (minimum 6 first violins, 5 second violins, 4 violas, 4 cellos, and 2 basses).

Form

The piece consists of five movements:

I. Prelude
II. Scherzo
III. Nocturne
IV. Fugue
V. Postlude

Composition

Based on his String Quartet (1995), as Corigliano explains: "My quartet is in five movements, three of which are notated in spatial notation. This means that the players do not count beats, but play more freely rhythmically, coordinating at various points but totally independent in others," requiring rewriting of this and other issues for larger ensemble.

Reception

The piece was awarded the 2001 Pulitzer Prize for Music.

Notable recordings
 Yuli Turovsky conducting the I Musici de Montreal
 John Storgards conducting the Helsinki Philharmonic

Sources

External links
"John Corigliano: Symphony No. 2; Suite from 'The Red Violin'", AllMusic.com. Yuli Turovsky.

Compositions by John Corigliano
Corigliano
2000 compositions
Pulitzer Prize for Music-winning works
Corigliano
Music commissioned by the Boston Symphony Orchestra